Gimnasio Nuevo León is an indoor arena in Monterrey, Mexico.  It is primarily used for basketball and is the home arena of the Fuerza Regia, 2017 Champion of the Liga Nacional de Baloncesto Profesional, Mexico's top basketball league. 

It holds 5,000 people.

Nuevo Leon
Volleyball venues in Mexico
Basketball venues in Mexico
Sports venues in Monterrey